"Sasanian culture" is the culture of the Sasanian Empire and may refer to:

 Sasanian architecture
 Sasanian music